Norway was represented by Britt Synnøve, with the song "Venners nærhet", at the 1989 Eurovision Song Contest, which took place on 6 May in Lausanne, Switzerland. "Venners nærhet" was chosen as the Norwegian entry at the Melodi Grand Prix on 11 March.

Before Eurovision

Melodi Grand Prix 1989 
The final was held at the Forum in Stavanger, hosted by Øystein Bache. Nine songs took part in the televised final, of which three songs were selected for a "super final". The winner was decided by a five-way jury; an expert jury made up of professional musicians, a press jury, and three public juries split by age group. Other participants included 1987's Kate Gulbrandsen, three-time Norwegian representative and MGP regular Jahn Teigen and Tor Endresen, who would represent Norway in 1997. The evening had its controversies, as fan favorite Jahn Teigen failed to reach the super final, which was met by booing from the audience.

At Eurovision 
On the night of the final Synnøve performed 8th in the running order, following the United Kingdom and preceding Portugal. Although "Venners nærhet" had been tipped as a likely top 10 contender, at the close of voting it had picked up only 30 points, placing Norway a disappointing 17th of the 22 entries. The Norwegian jury awarded its 12 points to the United Kingdom.

Voting

References

External links 
Full national final on nrk.no

1989
Countries in the Eurovision Song Contest 1989
1989
Eurovision
Eurovision